Amethysphaerion falsus is a species of beetle in the family Cerambycidae. It was described by Martins in 1995.

References

Elaphidiini
Beetles described in 1995